This is a list of notable inhabitants of Baguio, Luzon, Philippines.

Arts 

Benedicto Cabrera aka Bencab, painter, National Artist for Visual Arts.
Bert Nievera, singer
Kidlat Tahimik, filmmaker, writer and actor who is dubbed the Father of Philippine Alternative Cinema and now National Artist for Film
Ben Hur Villanueva, sculptor, painter, lecturer, educator and art entrepreneur.
Agnes Reoma, musician, bassist of Ben&Ben.
'''Venazir Martinez''', street muralist, and visual anthroprenuer best credited for Hila-bana Project using site-specific street art that challenged the public's visual perception on cultural markers and design theories.

Athletics 

 Roberto Cruz, former Filipino professional boxer who won the WBA World Light Welterweight title
 Eduard Folayang, Filipino professional mixed martial artist and wushu practitioner, Current ONE Lightweight World Champion and well decorated MMA-Wushu fighter.
 Kevin Belingon, a Filipino mixed martial artist and former ONE Championship Bantamweight Champion.
Geje "Gravity" Eustaquio, a Filipino Professional Mixed Martial Artist and former ONE Championship Flyweight Champion.
Joshua "The Passion" Pacio, a Filipino Professional Mixed Martial Artist and former ONE Championship Straw weight Champion.
Douglas Rimorin "Doug" Kramer. Professional Basketball Player, youtuber, Social Media personality.

Media personalities 

Paulo Avelino, actor, model, host and singer
John Medina, actor
Nanding Josef, actor
Van Ferro, American actor, was born in Baguio
Rocco Nacino,  actor, model, host
Ces Drilon (born 1961), farmer; retired ABS CBN employee journalism
Marc Logan,  journalist newscast and narrator
Kylie Verzosa, Bb. Pilipinas International 2016 and Miss international 2016
Bernadette Sembrano, a Filipina reporter, news presenter, and television host.
Robin Padilla, Filipino film actor, screenwriter, producer and director, current Senator.
Neri Naig-Miranda, Filipina Actress, 6th Runner-up Star Circle Quest.
Llyan Oliver Austria, architect and YouTube content creator.

Public service 

 Camilo Cascolan, Chief of the Philippine National Police.
 Marvic Leonen, Associate Justice of the Supreme Court of the Philippines.
 Benjamin Magalong, Mayor of Baguio and retired police officer.
Marquez "Mark" O. Go, Representative Lone District of Baguio.

American colonial period
 
 Henry Tureman Allen, a military officer who organized the Philippine Constabulary and namesake of Camp Henry T. Allen, the first home of the Philippine Military Academy 
 Robert Baden Powell, British founder of the Scouting Movement and namesake of the Baden-Powell Building, the former headquarters for Boy Scouts of the Philippines and meeting place for the First Philippine Commission
 Charles Henry Brent, Episcopal Missionary Bishop and founder of the Brent International School
 Daniel Burnham, the urban planner and architect responsible for the initial design of the city and namesake of Burnham Park
 William Cameron Forbes, American Governor-General of the Philippines who ordered Kennon Road to be built
 Eusebius Julius Halsema, American Civil Engineer and mayor of Baguio from 1922 to 1937; namesake of Halsema Highway
 Francis Burton Harrison, governor general for whom Harrison Road was named
 John Hay, United States Secretary of State and namesake of Camp John Hay
 Melvin Jones, founder of the Lions Club and namesake of Jones Grandstand in Burnham Park
 Joseph J. Keith Long serving police chief (1912–1941) who declared Baguio an open city on December 8, 1941 in face of the Japanese bombardment
 Lyman W.V. Kennon, builder and namesake for Kennon Road
 George A. Malcolm, American jurist establishing the U.P. College of Law and namesake of Malcolm Square in the city center
 William F. Pack, governor of Benguet province who planned the creation of Teacher's Camp and namesake of Governor Pack Road
 Robb White, (1909–1990) American writer of screenplays, television scripts, and adventure novels
 Leonard Wood, American military officer and Governor General from 1921 to 1927 for whom Leonard Wood Road was named
 Dean Conant Worcester, Member of First Philippine Commission and government official urging founding of Baguio as the "Summer Capital"

Literature
Luisa Igloria (Born 1961), poet, 20th Poet Laureate of Virginia, author and professor

Others
Joan Carling (born 1963), environmentalist and human rights defender
Maria Lorena Barros (1948-1976), activist, feminist, Anti-Martial Law hero
Sef Gonzales (Born 1980), convicted murderer who killed his family in Australia serving 3x life sentences without parole
Darwin Ramos (1994-2012), Servant of God, Filipino teenager.
Naomi Flores (1921-2013), resistance leader in World War II.

References

Baguio